The 2020 FIM CEV Moto2 European Championship was the eleventh CEV Moto2 season and the fifth under the FIM banner.

Calendar
The calendar was published in November 2019; a revised schedule was released on 16 June 2020 due to delays caused by the COVID-19 pandemic.

Calendar changes
 The round at Albacete was replaced with a round at Portimão.
 The round at Barcelona was dropped due to the COVID-19 pandemic.

Notes

Entry list

Championship standings
Scoring system
Points were awarded to the top fifteen finishers. A rider had to finish the race to earn points.

Riders' championship

Constructors' championship

References 

FIM CEV Moto2 European Championship

External links 
Official website

CEV Moto2